Fertagus is a commuter rail operator connecting Lisbon, Portugal's capital, to suburbs on the Setúbal Peninsula, located to the south across the Tagus River.  Fertagus crosses the river over the Ponte 25 de Abril.

Fertagus is owned by the Portuguese transportation company, Grupo Barraqueiro. The company's name derives from caminhos-de-ferro, meaning railway, and the Latin form of the river Tagus (which coincides with the English name).

Fertagus is the first private rail operator in Portugal. The company pays Infraestruturas de Portugal (IP) a fee for use of its infrastructure.

Fertagus transports 70,000 passengers daily.

Stations

Fertagus has a single line extending 54 kilometers, serving 14 stations.  An end-to-end trip takes 57 minutes.  The bridge crossing takes 7 minutes, while the time from between the stations closest to each end of the bridge is 9 minutes.

North of the Tagus (Lisbon)
Roma-Areeiro
Entre-Campos
Sete-Rios
Campolide

South of the Tagus (Setúbal district)
Pragal
Corroios
Foros de Amora
Fogueteiro
Coina
Penalva
Pinhal Novo
Venda do Alcaide
Palmela
Setúbal

Fleet
Fertagus operates 18 bilevel trains manufactured by Alstom between 1998 and 1999. Each train, comprising 4 cars, can carry 1,210 passengers, 476 of whom are seated.

Sulfertagus
In addition to train service, Fertagus operates Sulfertagus, a fleet of 43 shuttle buses to transport passengers to and from five south-of-the-river stations: Pragal, Corroios, Foros de Amora, Fogueteiro, and Coina.

See also
 Comboios de Portugal
 REFER
 CP Urban Services

References

External links
FERTAGUS | O Comboio da Ponte Official website 

Rail transport companies of Portugal